Thaddeus J. Murphy, better known as Ted Murphy, (April 23, 1935 – April 13, 2021) was an Irish wine historian and writer.

Biography
Murphy was born on April 23, 1935 in Cork, Ireland. He was educated at the North Monastery Primary School and Christian Brothers Secondary School located in Cork.

In 2005, his book, A Kingdom of Wine: A Celebration of Ireland's Winegeese, was published. The book was selected for the World Gourmand Awards held in Beijing, China. He is also known for coining a term Wine Geese.

In 2007, University College Cork conferred him an honorary doctorate for his research work in wine history.

Murphy played an instrumental role in establishing International Museum of Wine at Desmond Castle.

Bibliography
 A Kingdom of Wine: A Celebration of Ireland’s Winegeese (2005)

References

1935 births
2021 deaths
20th-century Irish writers